Llanfihangel Din Sylwy (spelling variants include Llanfihangel Din Silwy and Llanfihangel Tyn Sylwy) is a small, coastal (former) parish in the commote of Dindaethwy in north-east Anglesey, three miles north-northwest of Beaumaris.

A scattered settlement, it is distinguished by a hillfort known as Din Sylwy or Bwrdd Arthur and by a late medieval church dedicated to St. Michael (Welsh: Mihangel). The hillfort constitutes a relatively flat but partly overgrown area, 600 yards from the Irish Sea. Two entrances have been detected. The small fifteenth-century church consists of a simple nave and chancel and preserves a number of original features.

See also
List of Scheduled Monuments in Anglesey
List of hillforts in Wales

Sources
Anglesey: A survey and Inventory by the Royal Commission on Ancient and Historical Monuments in Wales and Monmouthshire, 1937, reprinted 1968.

Archaeological sites in Anglesey
Hillforts in Anglesey
Villages in Anglesey
Llanddona